Ángel Chacón (born December 1, 1972) is a Puerto Rican professional boxer. He's the former WBC FECARBOX super bantamweight, WBC Continental Americas super bantamweight, and the IBA featherweight Champion.

Amateur career
Chacón was born in Vega Alta, Puerto Rico. He had a very good amateur career and represented Puerto Rico at the 1992 Barcelona Olympic Games.

Professional career

WBC Super Bantamweight Championship
In February 1999, Chacón was knocked out in just two rounds by WBC Super Bantamweight Champion, Érik Morales at the Thomas & Mack Center in Las Vegas, Nevada.

IBA Featherweight Championship
On October 27, 2002 Chacón upset the American John Michael Johnson to win the IBA Featherweight title. The bout was the main event of ESPN's Friday Night Fights.

References

External links

1973 births
Living people
People from Vega Alta, Puerto Rico
Lightweight boxers
Puerto Rican male boxers
Olympic boxers of Puerto Rico
Boxers at the 1992 Summer Olympics